Michael Studdert-Kennedy was an American psychologist and speech scientist 1927–2017.https://haskinslabs. We org/news/michael-studdert-kennedy. He is well known for his contributions to studies of speech perception, the motor theory of speech perception, and the evolution of language, among other areas. He is a professor emeritus of psychology at the University of Connecticut and a professor emeritus of linguistics at Yale University. He is the former president (1986–1992) of Haskins Laboratories in New Haven, Connecticut. He was also a member of the Haskins Laboratories Board of Directors  and was chairman of the board from 1988 until 2001. He was the son of the priest and Christian socialist Geoffrey Studdert-Kennedy.

Representative publications
 Studdert-Kennedy, M. & Liberman, A. M. (1962). Psychological considerations in design of auditory displays for reading machines. Proceedings of the International Congress on Technology and Blindness, 1, 289–304.
 Studdert-Kennedy, M. & Cooper, F. S. (1966). High-performance reading machines for the blind. International Conference on Sensory Devices for the Blind, 317–340.
 A. M. Liberman, F. S. Cooper, D. S. Shankweiler, and M. Studdert-Kennedy. Perception of the speech code. Psychological Review, 74, 1967, 431–461.
 Studdert-Kennedy, M., Liberman, A. M., Harris, K. S., & Cooper, F. S. (1970). Motor theory of speech perception: A reply to Lane's critical review. Psychological Review, 77, 234–249.
 Studdert-Kennedy, M., & Shankweiler, D. P. (1970). Hemispheric specialization for speech perception. Journal of the Acoustical Society of America, 48, 579–594.      
 Studdert-Kennedy, M., Shankweiler, D., & Schulman, S. (1970). Opposed effects of a delayed channel on perception of dichotically and monotically presented CV syllables. Journal of the Acoustical Society of America, 48, 599–602.
 Studdert-Kennedy, M., Shankweiler, D., & Pisoni, D. (1972). Auditory and phonetic processes in speech perception: Evidence from a dichotic study. Journal of Cognitive Psychology, 2, 455–466.
 Studdert-Kennedy, M., & Hadding, K. (1973). Auditory and linguistic processes in the perception of intonation contours. Language and Speech, 16, 293–313.
 Studdert-Kennedy, M. (1975). Two questions. Brain and Language, 2, 123–130.* * Studdert-Kennedy, M. (1976). Speech perception. In N. J. Lass (Ed.), Contemporary issues in experimental phonetics (pp. 243–293). New York: Academic Press.
 Studdert-Kennedy, M. (1980). Speech perception. Language and Speech, 23, 45–66.
 Studdert-Kennedy, M., & Lane, H. (1980). Clues from the differences between signed and spoken language. In U. Bellugi & M. Studdert-Kennedy (Eds.), Signed and spoken language: Biological constraints on linguistic form (pp. 29–39). Deerfield Park, FL. 
 Studdert-Kennedy, M., & Shankweiler, D. (1981). Hemispheric specialization for language processes. Science, 211, 960–961.
 Studdert-Kennedy, M. (1993). Discovering phonetic function. Journal of Phonetics, 21, 147–155.
 Studdert-Kennedy, M. & Goodell, E.W. (1995).  Gestures, features and segments in early child speech. In: deGelder, B. & Morais, J. (eds.).  Speech and Reading: A Comparative Approach. Hove, England: Erlbaum (UK), Taylor & Francis.
 Studdert-Kennedy, M. (1998).  The particulate origins of language generativity:  from syllable to gesture.  In: Hurford, J., Studdert-Kennedy, M.,  & Knight, C. (eds.), Approaches to the evolution of language,   Cambridge, U.K.:  Cambridge University Press.
 Studdert-Kennedy, M. & Whalen, D.H. (1999).  A brief history of speech perception research in the United States. In A. Bronstein, J.Ohala & W.Weigel (eds) A guide to the history of the phonetic sciences in the United States. University of California Press: Berkeley CA.
 Studdert-Kennedy, M., Mody, M. & Brady, S. (2000). Speech perception deficits in poor readers: A reply to Denenbergfs critique. Journal of Learning Disabilities, v.33, 4, 317–321.
 Studdert-Kennedy, M. (2000).  Imitation and the emergence of segments. Phonetica, 57, 275–283.
 Studdert-Kennedy, M. (2000).  Evolutionary implications of the particulate principle: imitation and the dissociation of phonetic form from semantic function.  In: Knight, C., Studdert-Kennedy, M. & Hurford, J.R. (eds.). The Evolutionary Emergence of Language.  Cambridge:  Cambridge University Press.
 Studdert-Kennedy, M. & Goldstein, L. (2003). Launching language: The gestural origin of discrete infinity.  In Morten Christiansen and Simon Kirby (eds.).Language Evolution, Oxford: Oxford University Press, 235–254.            
 Studdert-Kennedy, M. (2005). How did language go discrete? Language Origins: Perspectives on Language, Oxford: Oxford University Press, pp. 48–67.

American cognitive scientists
Haskins Laboratories scientists
Speech perception researchers
University of Connecticut faculty
Yale University faculty
Living people
Year of birth missing (living people)